Fulton/North Central is a light rail station on METRORail's Red Line in Houston, Texas, United States. It opened as part of the Red Line extension on December 21, 2013.

Bus connections
78-Alabama/Irvington

METRORail stations
Railway stations in the United States opened in 2013
Railway stations in Harris County, Texas